The Swedish National Veterinary Institute (SVA) is a Swedish government agency that answers to the Ministry of Agriculture, Food and Consumer Affairs. The agency was established in 1911 and is located in Uppsala.

The agency is an expert organisation for veterinary medicine, aiming to promote animal health by preventing, diagnosing and controlling infectious diseases in animals. It is specialised in virology, bacteriology, antibiotic resistance, parasitology, chemistry, food safety, vaccinology and pathology. It provides advice and conducts commissioned investigations and programmes for controlling contagious diseases. One of the main commissions is zoonotic infections.

See also
Government agencies in Sweden

External links
Swedish National Veterinary Institute

Veterinary Institute
National agencies for veterinary drug regulation
Uppsala
Science and technology in Sweden
Government agencies established in 1911
1911 establishments in Sweden
Healthcare in Sweden